Nikolai Nikolayevich Zouev (20 May 1958 – 21 May 2022) was a Russian mixed martial artist. He competed in the Heavyweight division.

Career

He had a background in sambo and freestyle wrestling, starting a rivalry with Volk Han.

He debuted on 13 July 1993 at Fighting Network Rings "RINGS BATTLE DIMENSION '93" against Todor Todorov.

He spent most of his career in Fighting Network Rings in a variety of fighting codes including professional wrestling, Sambo and Mixed Martial Arts.  He had multiple matches against his rival Volk Han and Mitsuya Nagai.

He stopped fighting for RINGS on 21 February 1999 in a loss against Magomedkhan Gamzatkhanov as the promotion was shifting towards only doing MMA matches.

He became a coach after his retirement, helping to train fighters such as Sergei Kharitonov.

Zouev died on May 21, 2022 a day after his 64th birthday from years of heart disease.

Mixed martial arts record

|-
| Loss
| align=center| 1-4
| Magomedkhan Gamzatkhanov
| Submission
| Rings: Final Capture
| 
| align=center| 1
| align=center| 4:49
| Japan
| 
|-
| Loss
| align=center| 1-3
| Akira Maeda
| Submission (rear naked choke)
| Rings: Mega Battle Tournament 1997 Semifinal 1
| 
| align=center| 1
| align=center| 5:17
| Japan
| 
|-
| Win
| align=center| 1-2
| Mitsuya Nagai
| N/A
| Rings: Budokan Hall 1997
| 
| align=center| 0
| align=center| 0:00
| Tokyo, Japan
| 
|-
| Loss
| align=center| 0-2
| Tariel Bitsadze
| N/A
| Rings: Battle Dimensions Tournament 1996 Opening Round
| 
| align=center| 0
| align=center| 0:00
| 
| 
|-
| Loss
| align=center| 0-1
| Mikhail Ilyukhin
| N/A
| Rings: Battle Dimensions Tournament 1995 Opening Round
| 
| align=center| 0
| align=center| 0:00
| 
|

See also
List of male mixed martial artists

References

External links
 
 Nikolai Zouev at mixedmartialarts.com

1958 births
2022 deaths
Russian male mixed martial artists
Heavyweight mixed martial artists
Mixed martial artists utilizing sambo
Mixed martial artists utilizing freestyle wrestling
Russian sambo practitioners
Russian male professional wrestlers 
Sportspeople from Yekaterinburg